Voetbal Vereniging Moerse Boys is an association football club from Zundert, Netherlands. It was founded on 13 November 1943. Its home ground is Sportpark De Akkermolen in Klein Zundert. In 2019 the first male squad of Moerse Boys made it for the first time to the Hoofdklasse.

References

External links 
Official website

Football clubs in the Netherlands
Football clubs in North Brabant
Sport in Zundert
Association football clubs established in 1943
1943 establishments in the Netherlands